The 1943 Princeton Tigers football team was an American football team that represented Princeton University as an independent during the 1943 college football season. In their first season under head coach Harry Mahnken, the Tigers compiled a 1–6 record and were outscored  by a total of 226 to 96. Wayne Harding was Princeton's team captain. The team played its home games at Palmer Stadium in Princeton, New Jersey.

Schedule

References

Princeton
Princeton Tigers football seasons
Princeton Tigers football